Patrick Malone may refer to:

Patrick A. Malone (born 1951), Washington D.C. based trial attorney
Patrick Malone (Irish politician) (1916–1993), Irish Fine Gael politician
Pat Malone (hurler) (born 1965), retired Irish hurler
Patrick Malone (British politician) (1857–1939), British Member of Parliament for Tottenham South, 1918–1923 and 1924–1929
Matches Malone (Patrick Malone), a character from the television series Gotham